The 2016 Men's Under 18 Australian Championships was a field hockey tournament held in the Tasmanian city of Launceston from 8–17 July.

WA won the gold medal, defeating NSW State 2–1 in penalties after the final finished a 3–3 draw. VIC Blue won the bronze medal by defeating TAS 3–2 in the third place playoff.

Teams

 ACT
 NSW Blue
 NSW State
 NT
 QLD 1
 QLD 2
 SA
 TAS
 VIC Blue
 VIC White
 WA

Results

Preliminary round

Pool A

Pool B

Classification round

Ninth to eleventh place classification

Pool C

Fifth to eighth place classification

Crossover

Seventh and eighth place

Fifth and sixth place

First to fourth place classificiation

Semi-finals

Third and fourth place

Final

Statistics

Final standings

References

External links

2016 in Australian field hockey